ATVSI (Asosiasi Televisi Swasta Indonesia, Indonesian Private Televisions Association) is an organization that unites the national commercial television networks in Indonesia.

History

1997-2000: The Establishment of TVSNI 
The Pioneer of ATVSI at the new Order era, was the National TV Station that existed in this time such as RCTI, SCTV, TPI, ANteve and Indosiar agreed to form Televisi Swasta Nasional Indonesia (English: Indonesian National Private Television) as the place of communicate and coordinate for common interests as the Industry of Television. The Born of TVSNI nursed by Dewi Fajar (TPI), Harry Kuntoro (RCTI), Soeastomo Soepardji (Indosiar), Anton Nangoy (ANteve) and Agus Mulyanto (SCTV)

2000-2018: The Establishment of ATVSI 
Post reform era, after several meetings, then matured the formation of an association. On August 4, 2000, it was formed as 'ATVSI (Asosiasi Televisi Swasta Indonesia)' (English: Indonesian Private Television Association), by representatives of five National TV Stations, namely RCTI, SCTV, TPI, ANteve and Indosiar. The founders put the agreement in the meeting signed all by participants who attended among others, contended will be made AD/ART and formed by management organization ATVSI such as chairman and general secretary. Therefore, ATVSI it is legal. The chairman was elected for the first time as the Anton Nangoy (ANteve) and General Secretary was Soeastomo Soepardji (Indosiar) For term of office 2000-2003, and the first staff was Wida Wahyu Widyawati.

Along with time, as of year 2002, then the membership of National TV Station was tenth National TV Station such as RCTI, SCTV, TPI (now MNCTV), Indosiar, antv, Metro TV, Trans TV, TV7 (now Trans7), Lativi (now tvOne), and Global TV (now GTV)

As the administrators year 2003-2006 and 2006-2010, was Karni Ilyas (SCTV), and Zsa Zsa Yusharyahya (Metro TV) as general secretary. For 2006-2010 period was Nurhadi Poerwosapoetro (Indosiar) as general secretary. In Karni Ilyas period made some changes, and the name of Televisi Swasta Nasional Indonesia changes into Asosiasi Televisi Swasta Indonesia'. For management, other chairman of commission, also equipped as executive director, such as Uni Lubis (ANTV) and executive secretary Gilang Iskandar (RCTI)

Erick Thohir from tvOne was elected as the chairman ATVSI from year 2010-2013 and 2013-2015 or the third chairman. In the general meeting of ATVSI members on 10 November 2010, Erick Thohir as the chairman with general secretary as Warnedy (Trans TV)

Ishadi SK from Trans Media elected as the ATVSI chairman year 2015-2018, or the fourth chairman. In the general meeting of ATVSI members on 4 June 2015, Ishadi SK elected with representatives, Syafril Nasution (RCTI), Drs. Imam Soedjarwo (Indosiar), and general secretary Suryopratomo (Metro TV).

2019-present: Digital Era 
For 2019-2022 period, Chairman of ATVSI was Syafril Nasution from RCTI  and the representatives Don Bosco Selamun (Metro TV), and General Secretary Gilang Iskandar (SCTV) and Chief Treasurer was Suswati Handayani (Trans7), The Election was doing in General Meeting ATVSI Member on November 7th 2019 in Financial Club, Graha CIMB Niaga, Senayan, Kebayoran Baru, Jakarta Selatan

Members

ATVSI Administrators
 Anton Nangoy (2000-2003)
 Karni Ilyas (2003-2010)
 Erick Thohir (2010-2015)
 Ishadi SK (2015-2019)
 Syafril Nasution (2019-present)

Public Service Advertisement by ATVSI
 Bangun Pemudi Pemuda (by All Star Indonesian Artist & Athlete, 2016, Trans TV, Trans7 & CNN Indonesia Version)
 Bagimu Negeri (2016, Metro TV Version, remake of PSA SEA Games 1995)
 Cintai Indonesiamu (2016, ANTV Version)
 Virus Corona Bukan Untuk Ditakuti (2020, Trans TV Version)
 Social Distancing (2020, RCTI Version)

External links 
  Official website of ATVSI

Television organizations in Indonesia